Ozamia lucidalis is a species of snout moth in the genus Ozamia. It was described by Francis Walker in 1863. It is found on Hispaniola and Jamaica, as well as Cuba and in Mexico, on the Florida Keys and Texas.

The wingspan is 26–30 mm. The forewings are brown gray with darker markings and the hindwings are white.

The larvae feed on Opuntia spinosissima and Opuntia dillenii. They feed on the fruit of their host plant. The larvae are dark gray. They have been recorded in February, April, June, August and November.

References

Moths described in 1863
Phycitini